Schurig is a surname. Notable people with the surname include:

Craig Schurig (born 1965), American football coach and former player
Martin Schurig (1656–1733), German physician
Roger Schurig (born 1942), American basketball player
Stefan Schurig (born 1971), German architect